Vudi is the nickname of Mark Pankler (born 22 September 1952, Chicago), guitarist with San Francisco based indie rock band American Music Club. He is also the vocalist and guitarist in San Francisco based indie rock band Clovis de Floret.

He also played guitar and keyboards with Swans on their 1995 tour, and hence appeared on the double live album Swans Are Dead, during this period he also recorded various songs with the band which were included on their album Soundtracks for the Blind.  Vudi played on Red's Recovery Room. In 2013 he recorded guitar on Echo wild's “Comfortable” single. He also played guitar on one song on Danish band Pocket Life's 2013 album Rattle When You Walk. He played guitar on Jenifer McKitrick's live single "All My Lies", and three songs on her album Road Call, which is being released December 1, 2022.  

He is currently employed as a bus driver in Los Angeles.

References 

1952 births
Living people
Musicians from Chicago
20th-century American guitarists
American Music Club members